The following is a list of 500-series county routes in the U.S. state of New Jersey.  For more information on the county route system in New Jersey as a whole, including its history, see County routes in New Jersey.

500-series county routes

See also

References

 
500